Julian of Antioch ( AD 305  311), variously distinguished as    and  was a 4th-century Christian martyr and saint. He is sometimes confused with the St Julian who was martyred with his wife Basilissa.

Life
Of senatorial rank, he was killed during the persecutions of Diocletian. 

His legend states that he was subjected to terrible tortures, and paraded daily for a whole year through the various cities of Cilicia. He was then sewn up in a sack half-filled with scorpions, sand, and vipers, then cast into the sea. The waters carried his body to Alexandria, and he was buried there before his relics were translated to Antioch.

Veneration 
Saint John Chrysostom preached a homily in Julian's honor at Antioch, whose chief basilica was said to be the final resting place for Julian's relics and was known in his honor.

His feast day is June 21 in the Eastern Orthodox Church, and March 16 in the Catholic Church.

See also
 Saint Julian of Antioch, patron saint archive

References

External links
Saints of March 16
Lives of the Saints: Julian of Tarsus

Saints from Roman Anatolia
305 deaths
4th-century Christian martyrs
4th-century Romans
People from Tarsus, Mersin
Year of birth unknown